Invalidity Insurance (Industry, etc.) Convention, 1933 (shelved) is  an International Labour Organization Convention.

It was established in 1933:
Having decided upon the adoption of certain proposals with regard to compulsory invalidity insurance,...

Modification 

The concepts included in this convention were revised and included in ILO Convention C128, Invalidity, Old-Age and Survivors' Benefits Convention, 1967.

Ratifications
Prior to its being shelved, the convention had been ratified by 11 states.

External links 
Text.
Ratifications.

Health insurance
Health treaties
Shelved International Labour Organization conventions
Treaties concluded in 1933
Treaties entered into force in 1937